Gloria Wilson Swisher (born March 12, 1935) is an American composer, music educator and pianist.

Biography
Gloria Wilson Swisher was born in Seattle, Washington. She graduated from the University of Washington in Seattle where she received a Bachelor of Music, summa cum laude, Mills College in Oakland, California, where she earned a Master of Music in composition and the Eastman School of Music in Rochester, New York, where she earned a Ph.D. in 1960. She studied composition under John Verrall, Darius Milhaud, Bernard Rogers, and Howard Hanson. She is a member of The International Association of Women in Music, the Darius Milhaud Society and the American Society of Composers, Authors and Publishers. She was awarded the Sigma Alpha Iota Inter-American prize for her composition Salutations for oboe and piano.  Swisher was the subject of a 2009 University of Washington dissertation, The choral music of Gloria Wilson Swisher, by Robert Bigley.

Swisher has taught at Washington State University in Pullman, Pacific Lutheran University in Tacoma, Shoreline Community College (1969–1998) in Seattle, and the University of Washington in Seattle. She is a Professor Emerita of Music at Shoreline Community College, and often performs as a duo pianist with Nancy Matesky. She is a founding member of Ars Nova Press, Inc., a non-profit corporation that promotes and reprints the work of quality composers.

Works
Selected works include:

Orchestral Works:
1957 Canción, for orchestra
1960 Concerto for clarinet and orchestra
1986 Niigata No. Sumie Black Ink Impressions of Niigata, concerto for piano and orchestra
2004 Concerto for flute and orchestra
Serafina, portrait for orchestra

Works for large ensemble:
1955 3 Pieces for Piano & Band
1958 Suite for Piano & Wind Sinfonietta
1963 Dances for Tomorrow
1977 Thanksgiving I
1978 Procession
1984 Words to a Grand Child, for mixed choir and orchestra
The Mountain and The Island

Masses and liturgical music:
Psalm 150 for mixed choir, 2 trumpets, timpani and piano
God is Gone Up With A Merry Noise, for mixed choir and organ

Stage works:
Opera:
1983 The Artist and The Other - libretto: Willy Clark
1999 The Prestigious Music Award - premiered on February 18–20, 1999 at the Shoreline Community College Little Theater - libretto: Willy Clark
2008 The Legend of Poker Alice - libretto: Willy Clark

Theatre:
2004 Gallagher And The Moonbeam
Incidental music to "For Such A Time as This - text: Ann Chamberlin

Works for choir:
1973 Two Faces of Love, for mixed choir and piano
Beat! Beat! Drums, for mixed choir, 2 trumpets, timpani and piano
Let Us Celebrate, for mixed choir, 2 trumpets and piano

Vocal music:
1977 Sisters, for soprano and piano
I Sit and Sew
Tenebris
The Cabal at Nickel Nackeys
1983 Sonnets for Donald, for soprano and piano
1990 Three for T, for tenor and piano
1995 A Velvet Madonna, for soprano and piano
Montana, song cycle of six songs for mezzo soprano or baritone and piano

Chamber music
1990 Salutations, for oboe and piano
In 1991 Caprichos for guitar and piano
Pas de trois, for flute, violin and piano
Sado, for flute and piano
Theatre Trio for trumpet, alto saxophone and piano

Works for Organ:
2001 Chorale Prelude on "Slane" and "In Dulce Jubilo"

Works for Piano:
1983 "Joel" Variations
Siciliana
Transcending

References

External links
The Music of Gloria Wilson Swisher

1935 births
20th-century classical composers
21st-century classical composers
American women classical composers
American classical composers
American classical pianists
American women classical pianists
Living people
American opera composers
Pupils of Darius Milhaud
Pupils of Bernard Rogers
Pupils of Howard Hanson
University of Washington School of Music alumni
Mills College alumni
Eastman School of Music alumni
Washington State University faculty
Pacific Lutheran University faculty
University of Washington faculty
Musicians from Seattle
21st-century American composers
Sigma Alpha Iota
20th-century American women pianists
20th-century American composers
20th-century American pianists
21st-century American women musicians
20th-century women composers
21st-century women composers